Calopteryx may refer to:
 Calopteryx (damselfly), a genus of damselflies in the family Calopterygidae
 Calopteryx, a genus of plants in the family Ericaceae, synonym of Thibaudia